Munkar (Arabic: , 'denied', ‘wrong or immoral behaviour, vice’) may refer to:

 Munkar and Nakir, in Islamic eschatology, angels who test the faith of the dead in their graves
 Munkar (Hadith), a narration which goes against another authentic hadith

See also
 Enjoining good and forbidding wrong
 Munkir (TV series)